Ashford Borough Council is the local authority for the Borough of Ashford in Kent, England. The council is elected every four years. Since the last boundary changes in 2003, 43 councillors have been elected from 35 wards.

Political control
The first election to the council was held in 1973, initially operating as a shadow authority before coming into its powers on 1 April 1974. Political control of the council since 1973 has been held by the following parties:

Leadership
The leaders of the council since 1999 have been:

Council elections
1973 Ashford Borough Council election
1976 Ashford Borough Council election (New ward boundaries)
1979 Ashford Borough Council election
1983 Ashford Borough Council election
1987 Ashford Borough Council election
1991 Ashford Borough Council election
1995 Ashford Borough Council election
1999 Ashford Borough Council election
2003 Ashford Borough Council election (New ward boundaries reduced the number of seats by 6)
2007 Ashford Borough Council election
2011 Ashford Borough Council election
2015 Ashford Borough Council election
2019 Ashford Borough Council election (New ward boundaries)

Borough result maps

By-election results

1995-1999

2003-2007

2011-2015

The 2014 Wye by-election was triggered by the resignation of Councillor Steve Wright.

2015-2019

The 2016 Beaver by-election was triggered by the resignation of Councillor Jill Britcher.

The 2018 Kennington by-election was triggered by the resignation of Councillor Phil Sims.

2019-2023

The 2019 Downs North by-election was triggered by the death of Councillor Stephen Dehnel.

The 2020 Park Farm North by-election was triggered by the election of Councillor Jo Gideon to the UK Parliament as MP for Stoke-on-Trent Central.

The 2021 Beaver by-election was triggered by the death of Councillor Alex Ward.

The 2021 Downs North by-election was triggered by the resignation of Councillor Charles Dehnel.

The 2021 Highfield by-election was triggered by the death of Councillor Gerald White.

References

By-election results

External links
Ashford Borough Council

 
Borough of Ashford
Council elections in Kent
District council elections in England